Jean-Andoche Junot, 1st Duke of Abrantes (24 September 1771 – 29 July 1813) was a French military officer during the French Revolutionary Wars and the Napoleonic Wars.

Biography

Early life
Junot was born in Bussy-le-Grand, Côte-d'Or, son of Michel Junot, a farmer (1739–1814), and wife Marie Antoinette Bienaymé (1735–1806).  His father was the son of François Junot (?–1759) and wife Edmée Laurain (1703–1784), while his mother was the daughter of Guy Bienaymé and wife Ursule Rigoley. Jean-Andoche went to school in Châtillon. He was studying law in Dijon when the French Revolution started. After joining a battalion as volunteer, he was twice wounded and also made sergeant. He first met Napoleon Bonaparte during the siege of Toulon in 1793, when he became his secretary (aide de camp).

Italian campaign
He distinguished himself in Italy but received a serious head wound at Lonato, which some claim led to a permanent change in his character, reduced the quality of his judgement and made him rash and temperamental. He was made a general of brigade at the beginning of the Egyptian campaign but was injured in a duel and captured when he was returning as an invalid to France. He later participated in the coup of 18 Brumaire. He married Laure (Laurette) Martin de Permond, a long-time friend of the Bonapartes, in 1800. He was briefly ambassador to Portugal before hurrying back to serve under Napoleon at the Battle of Austerlitz (2 December 1805).

Peninsular War
Junot's major command was during the Peninsular War, when he commanded the 1807 Invasion of Portugal. Setting out in November from Salamanca, with the promise of a ducal title and a marshals baton, his vanguard accomplished a bloodless occupation of Lisbon on 30 November. For this feat, he was granted the ducal victory title of Duc d'Abrantès and was made Governor of Portugal, though he was not given the baton.

However, when a British expeditionary force landed, Junot was beaten at the Battle of Vimeiro on 21 August 1808, and he was cut off from France. Only the signing of the advantageous Convention of Sintra allowed him to avoid capture, taking with him "the weapons and baggages" and pillage the army had managed to gather—an expression that later became famous in Portuguese usage. He went back to France in October, narrowly escaping a court martial. He returned to the Iberian peninsula in 1810 in command of the VIII Corps, under Marshal André Masséna, and was badly wounded.

Later years
In the Russian campaign Junot's record was erratic. He was blamed for allowing the Russian army to retreat following the Battle of Smolensk (17 August), but at the Battle of Borodino (7 September 1812) he commanded the 8th Corps competently. Junot's performance at Smolensk infuriated Napoleon to the point that he vowed never to grant Junot a marshal’s baton.

In 1813 he was made Governor of the Illyrian Provinces but his growing mental instability, caused by his fall from favor, led to him being returned to France, to be placed under the surveillance of his father. Suffering from delirium he slashed at his broken leg and died of infectious complications several days later. Many think he committed suicide in Montbard.

Family and relations
He had two daughters and three sons:
 Othello (Egypt, c.1798), the child of an Abyssinian slave named Xraxarane born during the French campaign in Egypt. Junot brought Othello to France.
 Joséphine Junot d'Abrantès (Paris, 2 January 1802 – Paris, 15 October 1888), married in November 1841 to Jacques-Louis Amet
 Constance Junot d'Abrantès (Paris, 12 May 1803 – 1881), married in 1829 Louis Antoine Aubert (1799 – 1882), and had issue
 Louis Napoléon Andoche Junot, 2nd Duc d'Abrantès (Paris, 25 September 1807 – Neuilly, 20 February 1851), who died unmarried and without issue
 Andoche Alfred Michel Junot, 3rd Duc d'Abrantes (Ciudad Rodrigo, 25 November 1810 – killed in action at Solferino, 24 June 1859), married firstly on 2 April 1845 Marie Céline Elise Lepic (9 October 1824 – 6 June 1847), and married secondly on 10 January 1853 Marie Louise Léonie Lepic (19 July 1829 – 17 August 1868), both sisters, daughters of Joachim Lepic, 1st Baron Lepic, and wife Anne-Marguerite Pasquier, and had:
 Jeanne Joséphine Marguerite Junot d'Abrantès (Paris, 22 May 1847 – Lasray, 21 March 1934), married in Paris, 16 September 1869 Xavier Eugène Maurice Le Ray (Sèvres, 15 July 1846 – Paris, 1 December 1900), who was created 4th Duc d'Abrantès in 1869, and had issue extinct in male line in 1982
 Jérôme Napoléon Andoche Junot d'Abrantès (Paris, 16 June 1854 – Paris, 10 March 1857)
 Marguerite Louise Elisabeth Junot d'Abrantès (Paris, 25 January 1856 – 1919), married in Paris, 11 November 1883 César Elzéar Léon Vicomte Arthaud de La Ferrière (1853 – 1924).

During the peninsular war, he had a relationship with Juliana de Almeida e Oyenhausen, daughter of Leonor de Almeida Portugal, 4th Marquise of Alorna.

References

 Dubief Sylvain. "Junot, Premier aide de camp de Napoléon." SOTECA, Paris, 2020
 Chartrand, René. Vimeiro 1808. London: Osprey Publishing, 2001. 
 Haythornthwaite, Philip. Napoleon's Commanders (1) c. 1792–1809. London: Osprey Publishing, 2001.

Further reading

 

1771 births
1813 deaths
People from Côte-d'Or
French generals
French commanders of the Napoleonic Wars
French military personnel who committed suicide
Dukes of Abrantès
Military governors of Paris
Illyrian Provinces
Names inscribed under the Arc de Triomphe
Suicides by sharp instrument in France
Infectious disease deaths in France